Fangbone! is a Canadian animated children's television series developed by Simon Racioppa & Richard Elliott, very loosely based on the books by Michael Rex and produced by Radical Sheep Productions and Pipeline Studios in association with DHX Media. The series first aired in May 2014 on Family Chrgd, and concluded on January 24, 2017.

Plot
Fangbone is a nine-year-old barbarian warrior from Skullbania who has landed in Eastwood Elementary's third grade class to save his native land from the vile villain, Venomous Drool. With the help of his new sidekick Bill, a lovable, normal, goofy kid, Fangbone outwits his enemies while discovering the modern world, and the realities of his own world.

Characters

Main
Fangbone (voiced by Taylor Abrahamse) – Fangbone is a 9-year-old barbarian from Skullbania who travels through a magical portal into the suburbs of Earth on a dangerous mission. Taylor/Nathan also plays Fangbone's occasional preppy alter-ego, Fred Bone.
Bill Goodwin (voiced by Colin Doyle) — Bill becomes Fangbone's best friend. Bill is a kid whose weirdness is his ultimate weapon, and he helps Fangbone survive life on Earth.
Venomous Drool (voiced by Juan Chioran) — Venomous Drool is the most evil sorcerer in the universe! Drool lost his big toe – which has evil powers – so he sends his minions to get it back from Fangbone.

Supporting
Ms. Gillian (voiced by Kathy Lasky; her evil voice from "Warbrute of Friendship" voiced by Juan Chioran) — Ms. Gillian is Bill and Fangbone's third-grade teacher at school.
Ms. Goodwin (voiced by Stacey DePass) — Bill's Mom can be kind of silly but she's always there to take care of Bill and Fangbone.
Twinkle-Stick Wink-Winklestick-Stick (voiced by Mike Kiss) — He is a wizard of the Mighty Lizard Clan.

Also starring
Mike Kiss — Grimeblade, Troll, Pigotaur, One-Eye
Stacey DePass — Stacy, Eddy
Denise Oliver — Patty, Selena, Ann, Additional voices  
Matt Baram — Principal Bruce, Robert, Dr. Smilebright, Janitor
Ron Pardo — Clapperclaw, Narrator, Short Leg, AxeBear, Helmet Troll, Lazy Troll, Dr. Toothsbane, Lord Goblin, Orc, Grimeblade, Clump, Clod
Shemar Charles — Dibby (pilot episode only)
Cameron Ansell — Dibby (2nd episode and onwards)
Kedar Brown — Hairfang 
Tony Daniels — Carl, Warwagon
Mairi Babb — Melodica
Stephen McHattie — Duck of Always
Bryn McAuley — Cid
Martin Roach — Stoneback
Juan Chioran — Doctor
Nicole Stamp — Ingrit
Cory Doran — Kael, Skeletom, Hound, Doomgazer, Devon, Toofbreaker
Julie Lemieux — Hammerscab, The Toe
Linda Ballantyne — Wargrunt
Rob Tinkler — Borb

Episodes
Note: episodes 1, 6, 12, 20 and 26 are full-episode stories instead of 2 stories per episode.

Broadcast
The show premiered on Disney XD in the United States on July 5, 2016, and premiered on February 25, 2017 in Southeast Asia, and at unknown date in Taiwan and Latin America. On October 15, 2016, it first aired in Australia on ABC Me. In France, it first aired on Canal J on March 18, 2017. In the U.K., it started airing on CITV on April 3, 2017. In Germany, it started airing on Super RTL in 2015. It has now been on the Netflix streaming service since April 21, 2017.

References

2016 Canadian television series debuts
2017 Canadian television series endings
2010s Canadian animated television series
Animated series based on books
Animated television series about children
Canadian children's animated action television series
Canadian children's animated adventure television series
Canadian children's animated comedy television series
Canadian television shows based on children's books
Elementary school television series
English-language television shows
Television series by DHX Media
Television series by Radical Sheep Productions
Television shows set in New Jersey